Guy Lintilhac (10 July 1927 – 8 July 2014) was a French racing cyclist. He rode in the 1951 Tour de France.

References

1927 births
2014 deaths
French male cyclists
Place of birth missing